Tooting is a suburb in the London Borough of Wandsworth.

Tooting may also refer to:

 Tooting (UK Parliament constituency), comprising Tooting, Balham and Earlsfield
 Tooting (crater), a surface feature of the planet Mars
 8380 Tooting, an asteroid
 Tooting railway station
 Slang term for the act of passing flatus
 Posting on Mastodon, a social networking service